Hebrew Israelites may refer to:
 the ancient Israelites, considered as  a subgroup, ancestors of or identical with the Hebrews
 the modern Black Hebrew Israelites, groups of African Americans and others who believe they are descendants of the ancient Israelites